The lira (plural lire) was the currency of Italy between 1861 and 2002. It was first introduced by the Napoleonic Kingdom of Italy in 1807 at par with the French franc, and was subsequently adopted by the different states that would eventually form the Kingdom of Italy in 1861. It was subdivided into 100 centesimi (singular: centesimo), which means "hundredths" or "cents". The lira was also the currency of the Albanian Kingdom from 1941 to 1943.

The term originates from libra, the largest unit of the Carolingian monetary system used in Western Europe and elsewhere from the 8th to the 20th century. The Carolingian system is the origin of the French livre tournois (predecessor of the franc), the Italian lira, and the pound unit of sterling and related currencies.

In 1999 the euro became Italy's unit of account and the lira became a national subunit of the euro at a rate of €1 = Lit. 1,936.27, before being replaced as cash in 2002.

History

Etymology 

The Carolingian monetary system divided the libra into 20 solidi (singular: solidus) or 240 denarii (singular: denarius). These units translate in Italian to lira, soldo and denaro; in French to livre, sou and denier; and in English to pound, shilling and penny.

In France, the "franc" referred to a coin worth one livre tournois. This term was also adopted in various Gallo-Italic languages in north-western Italy to refer to the Italian lira.

Notation and symbols 
There was no standard sign or abbreviation for the Italian lira. The abbreviations Lit. (standing for Lira italiana) and L. (standing for Lira) and the sign ₤ or £ were all accepted representations of the currency. Banks and financial institutions, including the Bank of Italy, often used Lit. and this was regarded internationally as the abbreviation for the Italian lira. Handwritten documents and signs at market stalls would often use "£" or "₤" while coins used "L." Italian postage stamps mostly used the word  in full but some (such as the 1975 monuments series) used "L."

The name of the currency could also be written in full as a prefix or a suffix (e.g. Lire 100,000 or 100,000 Lire).

The ISO 4217 currency code for the lira was ITL.

Introduction of the lira 

The Napoleonic Kingdom of Italy first introduced the Italian lira in 1807 at par with the French franc, worth 4.5 grams of fine silver or 0.29032 gram of fine gold (gold-silver ratio 15.5). Despite the kingdom's demise in 1814, this new lira would eventually replace the currencies of the different Italian states until their unification in 1861, replacing, among others:
 The Piedmontese scudo, Sardinian scudo and the Genoese lira after 1800, by the Italian lira;
 The Milanese lira, Venetian lira, Lombardo-Venetian lira and Parman lira after 1814, at the rate of 270 Milanese lire = 45 Milanese scudi = 405 Venetian lire = 855 Parman lire = 207.23 Italian lire;
 The Tuscan fiorino and the Tuscan lira in 1859, at 1 francescone = 4 fiorini =  Tuscan lire = 5.6 Italian lire;
 The piastra of Naples and Sicily in 1861, at 1 piastra = 1.2 ducat di regno = 5.1 Neapolitan lire, the latter at par with the Italian lira; and
 The scudo of Rome and the Papal States in 1866, at 1 scudo = 5.375 Papal lire, the latter at par with the Italian lira.

In 1865, Italy formed part of the Latin Monetary Union in which the lira was set as equal to, among others, the French, Belgian and Swiss francs. The U.S. dollar was worth approximately 5.18 Italian lire until 1914.

20th century 
World War I broke the Latin Monetary Union and resulted in prices rising severalfold in Italy. Inflation was curbed somewhat by Mussolini, who, on 18 August 1926, announced a new exchange rate between the lira and sterling of £1 stg. = Lit. 90 (the so-called Quota 90) although the free exchange rate had been closer to Lit. 140Lit. 150 to the pound, causing a temporary deflation and widespread problems in the real economy. In 1927, the lira was pegged to the U.S. dollar at a rate of US$1 = Lit. 19. This rate lasted until 1934, with a separate "tourist" rate of $1 = Lit. 24.89 being established in 1936. In 1939, the "official" rate was Lit. 19.8.

After the Allied invasion of Italy, an exchange rate was set at $1 = Lit. 120 (£1 = Lit. 480) in June 1943, reduced to Lit. 100 the following month. In German-occupied areas, the exchange rate was set at  = Lit. 10. After the war, the value of the lira fluctuated, before Italy set a peg of US$1 = Lit. 575 within the Bretton Woods System in November 1947. Following the devaluation of the pound, Italy devalued to $1 = Lit. 625 on 21 September 1949. This rate was maintained until the end of the Bretton Woods System in the early 1970s. Several episodes of high inflation followed until the introduction of the euro.

Lira pesante 
Due to the lira's low value after the war economic calculations and price displays became unwieldy because of the large number of zeroes. As early as the 1950s suggestions were made to redenominate the lira but no serious efforts were made at that time. The lira pesante would have redenominated the currency at 1,000:1, removing 3 zeroes. However the project went dormant for several years before being revived in 1984. Ongoing heavy inflation saw the lira pesante pushed back until it was permanently abandoned in 1991 because of plans for a single European currency.

Introduction of the euro 
The lira was the official unit of currency in Italy until 1 January 1999, when it was replaced by the euro (the lira was officially a national subunit of the euro until the rollout of euro coins and notes in 2002). Old lira denominated currency ceased to be legal tender on 28 February 2002. The conversion rate was Lit. 1,936.27 to the euro.

All lira banknotes in use immediately before the introduction of the euro, and all post-World War II coins, were exchanged by the Bank of Italy up to 6 December 2011. Originally, Italy's central bank pledged to redeem Italian coins and banknotes until 29 February 2012, but this was brought forward to 6 December 2011.

Coins

Napoleonic coins
The Napoleonic Kingdom of Italy issued coins between 1807 and 1813 in denominations of 1 and 3 centesimi and 1 soldo (5 centesimi) in copper, c.10 in 20% silver alloy, s.5, s.10 and s.15 (or c.25, c.50 and c.75 centesimi), 1 Lira, 2 Lire and 5 Lire in 90% silver and 20 Lire and 40 Lire in 90% gold. All except the c.10 bore a portrait of Napoleon I, with the denominations below 1 Lira also showing a radiate crown and the higher denominations, a shield representing the various constituent territories of the Kingdom.

Kingdom of Italy, 1861–1946

In 1861, coins were minted in Florence, Milan, Naples and Turin in denominations of c.1, c.2, c.5, c.10 and c.50, 1 Lira, 2, 5, 10 and 20 Lire, with the lowest four in copper, the highest two in gold and the remainder in silver. In 1863, silver coins below 5 Lire were debased from 90% to 83.5% and silver c.20 coins were introduced. Minting switched to Rome in the 1870s.

Apart from the introduction in 1894 of cupro-nickel (later nickel) c.20 coins and of nickel c.25 pieces in 1902, the coinage remained essentially unaltered until the First World War.

In 1919, with the purchasing power of the lira reduced to one fifth of that of 1914, the production of all earlier coin types except for the nickel c.20 halted, and smaller, copper c.5 and c.10 and nickel c.50 coins were introduced, followed by nickel 1 Lira and 2 Lire pieces in 1922 and 1923, respectively. In 1926, silver 5 and 10 Lire coins were introduced, equal in size and composition to the earlier 1 Lira and 2 Lire coins. Silver 20 Lire coins were added in 1927.

In 1936, the last substantial issue of silver coins was made, whilst, in 1939, moves to reduce the cost of the coinage led to copper being replaced by aluminium bronze and nickel by stainless steel. All production of coinage halted in 1943.

In 1943 the AM-lira was issued, in circulation in Italy after the landing in Sicily on the night between 9 and 10 July 1943. After 1946, the AM-lira ceased to be the currency of employment and was used along with normal notes, until 3 June 1950.

Between 1947 and 1954, zone B of the Free Territory of Trieste used the Triestine lira.

Italian Republic, 1946–2002

In 1946 coin production was resumed, although only in 1948, with the purchasing power of the lira reduced to 2% of that of 1939, did numbers minted exceed 1 million. To begin with, four denominations were issued in aluminium, 1 Lira, 2 , 5 and 10 Lire: these coins were in circulation together with the AM-lire and some of the old, devalued coins of the Italian Kingdom. In 1951, the government decided to replace all the circulating coins and notes with new smaller-sized aluminium 1 Lira, 2 , 5 and 10 Lire (although the 2 Lire coin was not minted in 1951 or 1952) and in 1954–1955, Acmonital (stainless-steel) 50 and 100 Lire coins were introduced, followed by aluminium-bronze 20 Lire in 1957 and silver 500 lire in 1958. Increases in the silver bullion price led to the 500 lire coins being produced only in small numbers for collectors after 1967. The 500 Lire (and later the 1,000 Lire) also appeared in a number of commemorative coin issues, such as the centennial of Italian unification in 1961. Between 1967 and 1982, two types of "paper money" were issued with a value of Lire 500. These were not issued by "Banca d'Italia", but directly by the government bearing the title "Repubblica Italiana".

In 1977, aluminium-bronze 200 Lire coins were introduced, followed in 1982 by the bimetallic 500 Lire. This was the first bi-metallic coin to be produced for circulation, minted using a system patented by IPZS. It was also the first to feature the value in braille.

Production of 1 Lira and 2 Lire coins for circulation ceased in 1959; their mintage was restarted from 1982 to 2001 for collectors' coin sets. Production of the 5 Lire coin was greatly reduced in the late 1970s and ceased for circulation in 1998. Similarly, in 1991 the production of 10 and 20 Lire coins was limited. The sizes of the 50 and 100 Lire coins were reduced in 1990, but then they were completely redesigned 1993. A bimetallic 1,000 Lire coin was introduced in 1997 and stopped in 1998 due to the impending introduction of the euro.

Coins still being minted for circulation at the time of the changeover to euro (in 2000 and 2001 only lire for collectors coins sets were minted) were:
1 Lira (0.05 cents, only for collectors)
2 Lire (0.10 cents, only for collectors)
5 Lire (0.26 cents, only for collectors)
10 Lire (0.52 cents, only for collectors)
20 Lire (1.03 cents, only for collectors)
50 Lire (2.58 cents)
100 Lire (5.16 cents)
200 Lire (10.33 cents)
500 Lire (25.82 cents)
1,000 Lire (51.65 cents)

Banknotes 
In 1882, the government began issuing low-denomination paper money bearing the title "Biglietto di Stato" (meaning "Ticket of the state"). To begin with, there were 5 Lire and 10 Lire notes, to which 25 Lire notes were occasionally added from 1895. The government also issued notes titled "Buono di Cassa" between 1893 and 1922 in denominations of 1 Lira and 2 Lire. Production of Biglietti di Stato ceased in 1925 but resumed in 1935 with notes for 1 Lira, 2, 5 and 10 Lire being introduced by 1939.

The Bank of Italy began producing paper money in 1896. To begin with, 50, 100, 500 and 1,000 Lire notes were issued. In 1918–1919, 25 Lire notes were also issued but no other denominations were introduced until after the Second World War.

In 1943, the invading Allies introduced notes in denominations of 1 Lira, 2, 5, 10, 50, 100, 500 and 1,000 Lire. These were followed in 1944 by a series of Biglietti di Stato for 1 Lira, 2, 5 and 10 Lire, which circulated until replaced by coins in the late 1940s. The Bank of Italy introduced 5,000 and 10,000 Lire notes in 1947 and 1948, respectively.

In 1951, the government again issued notes, this time simply bearing the title "Repubblica Italiana". Denominations were of 50 and 100 Lire (replacing the Bank of Italy notes) and they circulated until coins of these denominations were introduced in the mid-1950s. In 1966, 500 Lire notes were introduced (again replacing Bank of Italy notes) which were produced until replaced in 1982 by a coin.

50,000 and 100,000 Lire notes were introduced by the Bank of Italy in 1967, followed by 2,000 Lire notes in 1973, 20,000 Lire notes in 1975 and 500,000 Lire notes in 1997.

In the mid-1970s, when coinage was in short supply, Italian banks issued "miniassegni" in several low denominations. Technically bearer cheques, they were printed in the form of banknotes and were generally accepted as substitute legal currency.

Notes in circulation when the euro was introduced were:

1,000 Lire, Maria Montessori (€0.516)
2,000 Lire, Guglielmo Marconi (€1.03)
5,000 Lire, Vincenzo Bellini (€2.58)
10,000 Lire, Alessandro Volta (€5.16)
20,000 Lire, Tiziano Vecellio (€10.32) 
50,000 Lire, Gian Lorenzo Bernini (€25.82)
100,000 Lire, Caravaggio (€51.65)
500,000 Lire, Raffaello (€258.23)

Gallery

Currencies formerly related to the Italian lira

Vatican City
The Vatican lira (plural lire) was the official unit of the Vatican City State. It was at par with the Italian lira under the terms on the concordat with Italy. Italian lira notes and coins were legal tender in the Vatican City, and vice versa. Specific Vatican coins were minted in Rome, and were legal tender also in Italy and San Marino.

The Vatican City switched to the euro along with Italy and San Marino. As with old Vatican lira coins, the Vatican City has its own set of euro coins.

San Marino
The Sammarinese lira (plural lire) was the official unit of San Marino. Like the Vatican lira, the Sammarinese lira was at par with the Italian lira.

Italian lira notes and coins were legal tender in San Marino (and vice versa). Specific Sammarinese coins were minted in Rome, and were legal tender in Italy, as well as the Vatican City.

San Marino switched to the euro along with Italy and the Vatican City. As with old Sammarinese lira coins, the country has its own set of euro coins.

Miniassegni
Miniassegni (singular: miniassegno) were a type of notgeld that circulated in Italy in the late 1970s in place of change, as in that period small-denomination coins were scarce and were often substituted with candy, stamps, telephone tokens, or even public transport tickets. The first miniassegni appeared in December 1975, and they were subsequently issued by many banks; they had nominal values of 50, 100, 150, 200, 250, 300 and 350 Lire.

Restoration
In 2005, the Lega Nord launched a campaign to reintroduce the lira as a parallel currency. In 2014, Beppe Grillo, leader of the Five Star Movement, also raised the same point.

See also
 Economy of Italy
 Italian euro coins
 Economy of San Marino
 Sammarinese euro coins
 Economy of Vatican City
 Vatican euro coins

Notes

References

External links

Overview of Italian lira from the BBC
The pre-euro banknotes of Italy 

Lira
Lira
Currencies replaced by the euro
Currencies of Europe
Lira
Franc
Modern obsolete currencies
Currencies of San Marino
Currencies of Vatican City
Currencies introduced in 1861
Lira